Charles Maynard may refer to:
 Charles Maynard (Bahamian politician) (1970–2012)
 Charles Maynard (MP) (c. 1598–1665), MP for Chippenham, 1624
 Charles Maynard, 1st Viscount Maynard (died 1775), British peer
 Charles Johnson Maynard (1845–1929), American naturalist and ornithologist
 Charles Frederick Maynard (1897–1946), founder of the Australian Aboriginal Progress Association